Dinsdale James Landen (4 September 1932 – 29 December 2003) was an English actor. His television appearances included starring in the shows Devenish (1977) and Pig in the Middle (1980). The Independent named him an "outstanding actor with the qualities of a true farceur." He performed in many Shakespeare plays at Stratford-upon-Avon and Regent's Park Open Air Theatre.

Early life
Landen was born at Margate, Kent and educated at King's School, Rochester.

Career
Landen made his television debut in 1959 as the adult Pip in an adaptation of Great Expectations and made his film debut in 1960, with a walk-on part in The League of Gentlemen. 

During the 1960s, he starred in the TV series Mickey Dunne and The Mask of Janus, and its spinoff series The Spies. In 1969, he starred as Chris Champers in the comedy series World in Ferment. As a stage actor, he appeared as Richard Dazzle in the RSC's 1970 production of London Assurance. He appeared in James Saunders's play Bodies in the West End in 1979, receiving a nomination for a Society of West End Theatre Award.

His film roles include appearances in Operation Snatch (1962), A Jolly Bad Fellow (1964), Rasputin, the Mad Monk (1966), Mosquito Squadron (1969), Every Home Should Have One (1970), Young Winston (1972), Digby, the Biggest Dog in the World (1973), International Velvet (1978), Morons from Outer Space (1985) and both The Buccaneers and The Steal in 1995.

On radio, he appeared as General Bel Riose in the 1973 BBC Radio 4 adaptation of The Foundation Trilogy, as Dr. Watson in the 1974 adaptation of A Study in Scarlet, and Art Gordo in the 1976 adaptation of Jim Eldridge's novel Down Payment on Death. He portrayed Rupert Purvis in the 1982 production of Tom Stoppard's play The Dog It Was That Died, and played the urbane Ambassador McKenzie in BBC Radio 4 series of Flying the Flag.

Landen played Dr. Mark Thorn, Guardians officer and official psychiatrist, in Episode 6 of the 1971 London Weekend Television series, The Guardians.

Dinsdale Landen was the only actor to play the same character, private detective Matthew Earp, in two episodes of Thriller ("An Echo of Theresa" and "The Next Scream You Hear" from 1973 and 1974 respectively).

In 1977, Landen starred in his own situation comedy, Devenish, playing a Basil Fawlty-type character in a Reggie Perrin-type situation, designing board games. In 1980, he starred as Barty Wade in the television series Pig in the Middle with Liza Goddard.

In 1984, Landen played Jean-Martin Charcot in the television series Freud.

In 1987, he played the lead in a BBC TV production of What the Butler Saw, playing Dr Prentice in a production also featuring Prunella Scales, Timothy West and Bryan Pringle.

In 1989, he made a guest appearance in Doctor Who as Dr. Judson, a wheelchair-using genius taken over by the titular villain of the serial The Curse of Fenric.

In 1992, Landen provided the voice of the arch villain Mr. Tod in the BBC/Fuji Television children's animated series The World of Peter Rabbit and Friends. He played a recurring role on Lovejoy, a mentor to the main character during the series run in the 1990s.

Personal life
He was married to the actress Jennifer Daniel. He and his wife wrote the 1985 nonfiction book The True Story of H.P. Sauce.

Death
Dinsdale Landen died at his home in South Creake, Norfolk, on 29 December 2003 after becoming ill with pneumonia. He had been diagnosed with oral cancer several years before his death, but was in remission at the time.

Filmography

References

External links

Independent obituary

1932 births
2003 deaths
English male film actors
English male radio actors
English male Shakespearean actors
English male stage actors
English male television actors
Male actors from Kent
People educated at King's School, Rochester
People from Margate
Royal Shakespeare Company members